is a former Japanese football player.

Club statistics

References

External links

sonysendaifc.com

1983 births
Living people
Chuo University alumni
Association football people from Tokushima Prefecture
Japanese footballers
J2 League players
Japan Football League players
Tokushima Vortis players
Sony Sendai FC players
Kamatamare Sanuki players
FC Osaka players
Association football defenders